The Surreal Life is an American reality television series that records a group of celebrities as they live together in Glen Campbell's former mansion in the Hollywood Hills for two weeks. The format of the show resembles that of The Real World and Road Rules, in that the cameras not only record the castmates' participation in group activities assigned to them, but also their interpersonal relationships and conflicts. The series is also likened to The Challenge in that previously known individuals from separate origins of entertainment are brought together into one cast. The show's first two seasons aired on The WB, and subsequent seasons were shown on VH1.

Series overview

Season 1 (2003)
The first season of The Surreal Life began airing on January 9, 2003, and starred Gabrielle Carteris, MC Hammer, Corey Feldman, Emmanuel Lewis, Jerri Manthey, Vince Neil, and Brande Roderick. Throughout the two-week production, the cast participated in a Survivor-inspired camping trip, a trip to Las Vegas, and a drama-creating Corey Feldman, who married his girlfriend in the season finale. Mindy Cohn was scheduled to be a cast member, but dropped out before taping began. Robin Givens was also offered a slot on the cast, but declined.

Season 2 (2004)
The second season of The Surreal Life began airing on January 11, 2004, and starred Traci Bingham, Trishelle Cannatella, Erik Estrada, Tammy Faye Messner, Ron Jeremy, and Vanilla Ice. Some episode plots involved Ron Jeremy's topless porn-star pool party and Tammy Faye's book signing with members of the gay and transgender community. In one episode, the cast works at a local retro diner under the management, Vanilla Ice hoists Gary Coleman above the deep fryer, and insists on having the former child star say his catchphrase, "What'chu talkin' 'bout, Willis?" in public after Coleman's Strokes co-star Todd Bridges shows up. These acts led the former sitcom star to "fire" Ice and then quit. The season also introduced "Dirty Laundry," The Surreal Life talk show hosted by Sally Jessy Raphael. Raphael focused on Cannatella, making several unflattering remarks about her drinking problem, including that she acted "like a slut." Other moments included a surprise stop at the Desert Shadows Inn, a nudist resort (from which Tammy Faye fled in tears), and the production of a children's play.

Season 3 (2004)
The third season of The Surreal Life began airing on September 5, 2004, and starred Charo, Dave Coulier, Flavor Flav, Jordan Knight, Brigitte Nielsen, and Ryan Starr. Memorable moments included Date Night, an agonizing recording session for the group to produce an original song, and Flavor's insistence that he drive the group's RV despite not having a license. Flavor also caused a brief disconnection with the cast, when it was revealed during "Dirty Laundry" that he had hit The Surreal Life puppy. The Surreal Life puppy, now age 11, lives in Long Beach, California, after being given to friends of Dave Coulier after the show. The puppy's name is Winger after the Detroit Red Wings.   Throughout the two weeks, Nielsen and Flav began a relationship which would have a dramatic influence on VH1's programming over the next five years, as it indirectly spawned 14 spinoffs and sequels to date. The romance first continued in Strange Love and snowballed from there, after the success of the Flavor of Love series.

Season 4 (2005)
The fourth season of The Surreal Life began airing on January 9, 2005, and starred Da Brat, Adrianne Curry, Christopher Knight, Chyna, Marcus Schenkenberg, Verne Troyer, and Jane Wiedlin. Notable moments included conflict between Da Brat and Wiedlin that stemmed from comments made by Da Brat about Wiedlin that were shown during "Dirty Laundry," and the strained relationship between Chyna and her now-ex-boyfriend Sean Waltman. More memorable moments included Troyer getting drunk on the first day and urinating in the weight room, and Wiedlin getting upset about the group being asked to brand a cow. Like the season prior, another romance-themed spin-off, My Fair Brady, was developed around the romantic escapades of Curry and Knight.

Season 5 (2005)
The fifth season of The Surreal Life began airing on July 10, 2005, and starred Caprice Bourret, Jose Canseco, Sandy "Pepa" Denton, Janice Dickinson, Carey Hart, Omarosa Manigault, and Bronson Pinchot. This season played up on the show's namesake surreality by having the house decorated with a circus/carnival theme and the cast was given circus-style taglines during the introduction. This was enhanced with the introduction of a three-legged dog named Lucky. An ongoing feud between Manigault and Dickinson was a key focus point in the season, which ended with Dickinson leaving the house during the final dinner.

Season 6 (2006)
The sixth season of The Surreal Life began airing on March 19, 2006, and starred Alexis Arquette, C.C. DeVille, Steve Harwell, Sherman Hemsley, Maven Huffman, Tawny Kitaen, and Andrea Lowell. Florence Henderson ("Dr. Flo") assisted the cast as the house therapist. Throughout the two weeks, the cast shot a music video, produced and broadcast a live news program, booked and hosted their own talk-show pilots, and participated in a "battle of the bands" competition. During the talk-show episode, Marla Gibbs makes a cameo appearance with Hemsley, and the two re-create their retorts and putdowns as Florence and George from The Jeffersons. Arquette brings the transgender community increased visibility and awareness with her appearance in the series. And, struggling with memory and enunciation problems that grow worse, Kitaen is inexplicably left crawling on the floor of a closet by the final episode.

Season 7 (2022)
Announced in July 2021, the seventh season starred August Alsina, CJ Perry, Dennis Rodman, Frankie Muniz, Kim Coles, Manny MUA, Stormy Daniels, and Tamar Braxton living together and competing in a series of challenges.

Production history
The Surreal Life creators, Cris Abrego, Mark Cronin, and Rick Telles, met with their agents (Chris Coelen and Sara Chazen at UTA) who pitched the idea to them as a possible reality show concept and suggested the title "Surreal World" (after MTV's "The Real World"). The name was later changed to Surreal Life to avoid legal issues.

Home media
Seasons one, two, and five were released in the U.S., but have since been discontinued. All six seasons have been released on DVD in Australia by Shock Records.

Spin-offs
The Surreal Life is one of VH1's most spun-off shows, with a complex web of reality series which have had spin-off shows themselves. The first spin-off from The Surreal Life was Strange Love, starring Flavor Flav and Brigitte Nielsen, both of season three. It premiered in January 2005 and ran for 11 episodes. The second spin-off, My Fair Brady, starred Adrianne Curry and Christopher Knight. It ran its first season in 2005, concluding with the couple's engagement. The second season debuted in the spring 2006, concluding with a wedding. The third season premiered on January 20, 2008, and detailed the newlyweds' lives as they prepared to expand their family.

The Surreal Life: Fame Games reunited cast members of the original Surreal Life series in a competition for cash and prizes.

Pepa received her own two shows stemming from her popularity on VH1. She teamed up with her old partner Cheryl "Salt" James for The Salt-N-Pepa Show, which showcased the two distinct personalities clash on many issues from their break-up as a group in the 1990s to their current reformation. The series spanned two seasons. In 2010, Pepa also received her own show on VH1 that documented her search for her Mr. Right entitled "Let's Talk About Pep."

Of Love series
Strange Love itself produced a spin-off show, titled Flavor of Love, which lasted for three seasons, ending with Flav's announcement that he had found his one true love. Due to the show's great success, it spawned a successful franchise with Rock of Love with Bret Michaels.

Contestant dating shows
Some contestants went on to star in their own dating show spinoffs. The first was Flavor of Loves Tiffany Pollard, a.k.a. New York, with I Love New York (two seasons). Three of her suitors got their own show: Brothers Kamal "Chance" and Ahmad "Real" Givens starred in Real Chance of Love (two seasons) and Frank "The Entertainer" Maresca starred in Frank the Entertainer in a Basement Affair.

Game shows
Contestants from Flavor of Love, Rock of Love with Bret Michaels, and Real Chance of Love were offered to participate in Charm School, which lasted three seasons, with the premise of bettering themselves and a chance at a cash prize.

Contestants from Flavor of Love, Rock of Love, I Love New York, Real Chance of Love, For the Love of Ray J, Rock of Love Bus, Daisy of Love, and Megan Wants a Millionaire were allowed to take part in I Love Money, a Survivor elimination-style show held in a Mexican mansion. Four seasons were produced but the third never aired due to the involvement of Ryan Jenkins.

Unscripted shows
Contestants New York, Real and Chance later starred in additional unscripted shows. New York Goes to Hollywood followed Pollard's attempt at becoming an actress, New York Goes to Work saw Tiffany Pollard perform various jobs as voted by the viewers on a weekly basis, and Real and Chance: The Legend Hunters followed the Givens brothers in their quest to find legendary monsters such as Bigfoot.

References

External links
 

 Reality TV World page
 

2003 American television series debuts
2000s American reality television series
2020s American reality television series
American television series revived after cancellation
Celebrity reality television series
The WB original programming
VH1 original programming
English-language television shows
Television series by Endemol
Television series by Lionsgate Television